Khreshchenivka is a village in Beryslav Raion, Kherson Oblast, southern Ukraine, about  northeast of the centre of Kherson city. It belongs to the Novovorontsovka settlement hromada, one of the hromadas of Ukraine.

Administrative status
Until 18 July, 2020, Khreshchenivka belonged to Novovorontsovka Raion. The raion was abolished in July 2020 as part of the administrative reform of Ukraine, which reduced the number of raions of Kherson Oblast to five. The area of Novovorontsovka Raion was merged into Beryslav Raion.

History 

The village came under attack by Russian forces during the Russian invasion of Ukraine in 2022 and the 3rd of October 2022 was recovered by the Ukrainian forces in a new offensive.

Demographics
The native language distribution as of the Ukrainian Census of 2001 was:
 Ukrainian: 95.90%
 Russian: 3.21%
 Belarusian: 0.38%
 Bulgarian: 0.13%
 Moldovan (Romanian): 0.13%
 Polish: 0.13%

References

Villages in Beryslav Raion